Alex Davis may refer to:

 Alex Davis (footballer), New Zealand football player
 Alex Davis (basketball) (born 1992), American basketball player
 Alex Davis (Arrowverse)
 Alex Davis (rugby union)

See also
 Alexander Davis (disambiguation), multiple people
 Alex Davies (disambiguation)